Will Kelly (born 5 August 1997) is a Canadian rugby union player who plays for Canadian team the Toronto Arrows of Major League Rugby (MLR) as a fly-half.

Kelly made his debut for the Canadian national side in 2019, whilst he was playing in Wales for the Dragons academy, Cross Keys and the Dragons U23 side. Although born in Wales, Kelly grew up in Canada.

On September 6, 2019 Kelly signed with the Toronto Arrows of Major League Rugby.

References

External links 
Dragons profile
itsrugby.co.uk profile

Canada international rugby union players
Dragons RFC players
Living people
1997 births
Canadian rugby union players
Rugby union fly-halves
Rugby union fullbacks
Toronto Arrows players